Fadi (also spelled Fahdi or Fadhi) is a given name meaning "redeemer or savior". Fady and Fadey are similar names. Notable people with the name include:

Given name
 Fadi Abboud (born 1955), Lebanese businessman and politician
 Fadi Afash (born 1974), Syrian footballer
 Fadee Andrawos (born 1981), Lebanese singer and actor of Palestinian origin
 Fadi Frem (born 1953), Lebanese politician
 Fadi Ghosn (born 1979), Lebanese footballer
 Fadi Hammadeh (born 1972), Syrian race car driver
 Fadi El Khatib (born 1979), Lebanese basketball player
 Fadi Makki, Lebanese businessman and politician

Fictional characters
 Fadi, fictional character in the Robert Ludlum novel The Bourne Betrayal

References

Arabic masculine given names